Josh Matthews may refer to:

Josh Mathews, American presenter/announcer working for Impact Wrestling
Josh Matthews (Family Affairs), a fictional character in the British TV soap opera Family Affairs